The Catskill Scenic Trail is a multi-use rail trail along the former Ulster and Delaware Railroad right-of-way in rural Delaware County, New York. The western portion of the trail runs along the West Branch of the Delaware River.

The trail serves mainly bikers and hikers in the warmer months and snowmobilers and cross country skiers in the winter months.  It is owned by the Delaware and Ulster Railroad tourist railroad and maintained by the non-profit Catskill Revitalization Corporation.

Gallery

References

External links 

 Catskill Revitalization Corporation, Inc. - Founded and Maintains the Catskill Scenic Trail
 Route of the trail

Protected areas of Delaware County, New York
Ulster and Delaware Railroad